John Mortimer Harrell (December 14, 1828July 4, 1907) was an American lawyer and writer. He composed the very first telegram sent from Little Rock to Memphis.  During the American Civil War, he distinguished himself as a cavalry officer in the operations of the West. Afterwards, he served as commander of the Southern Division, Arkansas United Confederate Veterans.

Life and career 
In 1861 John Mortimer Harrell was the political editor of the Old Line Democrat. He was the editor of the Southern States, a weekly that succeeded the Old Line Democrat. In 1876 he was one of the editors of the Arkansas Gazette. Soon after this he removed to Hot Springs, where he continued to reside for many years, until the death of his wife, when he moved out of the State. In about 1880 he was the editor of the Hot Springs Telegraph.

During the Reconstruction Period, he served as secretary of the 1867 Democratic convention. He wrote extensively about politics in Little Rock during this time, keeping newspaper clippings and long commentaries on the articles. His writings were published in 1893 as the Brooks and Baxter War, and are one of the most prominent sources on the Brooks–Baxter War. In 1899, Harrell and John Dimitry co-authored Confederate Military History, Volume X: Louisiana and Arkansas.

Selected works 
 Brooks and Baxter War (1893)
 Confederate Military History, Volume X (1899)

See also  

 List of members of the United Confederate Veterans
 List of United States attorneys for the Eastern District of Arkansas

References

External links

 
 John M. Harrell at The Political Graveyard
 
 

1828 births
1907 deaths
19th-century American lawyers
19th-century American male writers
19th-century American newspaper editors
19th-century American non-fiction writers
American Civil War prisoners of war
American non-fiction writers
American people of Irish descent
Arkansas Democrats
Burials in Arkansas
Cavalry commanders
Confederate States Army officers
Journalists from Arkansas
Lawyers from Little Rock, Arkansas
Male non-fiction writers
Military personnel from Little Rock, Arkansas
People of Arkansas in the American Civil War
People from Gatesville, North Carolina
United Confederate Veterans
United States Attorneys for the Eastern District of Arkansas
University of Nashville alumni
Writers from Little Rock, Arkansas
Writers of American Southern literature